Diary for My Lovers is a 1987 Hungarian drama film directed by Márta Mészáros. It was entered into the 37th Berlin International Film Festival, where it won the Silver Bear for an outstanding single achievement. The film was selected as the Hungarian entry for the Best Foreign Language Film at the 60th Academy Awards, but was not accepted as a nominee.

Cast
 Ágnes Csere as Juli (voice)
 Zsuzsa Czinkóczi as Kovács Juli
 Anna Polony as Egri Magda
 Mária Ronyecz as Magda (voice)
 Jan Nowicki as János
 Tamás Végvári as János (voice)
 Erika Szegedi as Anna Pavlova (voice)
 Mari Szemes as Nagymama
 Vilmos Kun as Nagyapa (voice)
 Pál Zolnay as Nagyapa
 Adél Kováts as Natasa
 Irina Kuberskaya as Anna Pavlova (as Irina Kouberskaya)
 Erzsébet Kútvölgyi as Erzsi
 Jerzy Bińczycki as Professzor
 László Vajda as Professzor (voice)
 Gyula Bartus as Dezsõ

See also
 List of submissions to the 60th Academy Awards for Best Foreign Language Film
 List of Hungarian submissions for the Academy Award for Best Foreign Language Film

References

External links
 

1987 films
1987 drama films
Hungarian drama films
1980s Hungarian-language films
Films directed by Márta Mészáros